Habuprionovolva is a genus of sea snails, marine gastropod mollusks in the family Ovulidae.

Species
Species within the genus Habuprionovolva include:
Habuprionovolva aenigma (Azuma & Cate, 1971)
Habuprionovolva basilia (Cate, 1978)
Habuprionovolva hervieri (Hedley, 1899)
Habuprionovolva umbilicata (Sowerby, 1848)

References

External links

Ovulidae